The 1943 Maryland Terrapins football team represented the University of Maryland in the 1943 college football season. In their first season under head coach Clarence Spears, the Terrapins compiled a 4–5 record (2–0 in conference), finished in second place in the Southern Conference, and were outscored by their opponents 194 to 105.

Schedule

References

Maryland
Maryland Terrapins football seasons
Maryland Terrapins football